Cavia guianae is a guinea pig species from South America. It is found in southern Venezuela, Guyana, and portions of northern Brazil. Some biologists believe it to be a feral offshoot of the domestic guinea pig, Cavia porcellus; others subsume it under the wild cavy, Cavia aperea. Molecular data collected show there is little genetic differentiation in C.a. guianae known to be a lowland locality in comparison to C. anolaimae which are predominantly highland populations.

References
Sources
 Woods C. A. and C. W. Kilpatrick.  2005. Hystricognathi pp. 1538-1600 in D. E. Wilson and M. A. Reeder, eds. Mammal Species of the World, 3rd edition, p. 1553.

Dunnum, Jonathan L.; Salazar-Bravo, Jorge (2010–11). "Molecular systematics, taxonomy and biogeography of the genus Cavia (Rodentia: Caviidae): Systematics of Cavia". Journal of Zoological Systematics and Evolutionary Research. 48 (4): 376–388. doi:10.1111/j.1439-0469.2009.00561.x.
Citations

Guinea pigs
Fauna of northern South America
Rodents of South America
Mammals described in 1901
Taxa named by Oldfield Thomas